General Sewell may refer to:

Horace Sewell (1881–1953), British Army brigadier general
Timothy Toyne Sewell (born 1941), British Army major general
William Henry Sewell (c. 1786–1862), British Army general

See also
Attorney General Sewell (disambiguation)